The 1968–69 WHL season was the 17th season of the Western Hockey League. Six teams played a 74-game schedule, and the Vancouver Canucks were the Lester Patrick Cup champions, defeating the Portland Buckaroos four games to none in the final series. The Denver Spurs joined the WHL as sixth team.

Final standings 

bold - qualified for playoffs

Playoffs 

The Vancouver Canucks defeated the Portland Buckaroos 4 games to 0 to win the Lester Patrick Cup.

References

Western Hockey League (1952–1974) seasons
1968–69 in American ice hockey by league
1968–69 in Canadian ice hockey by league